Meleager and Atalanta is a 1620-1623 painting by Jacob Jordaens, now in the Museo del Prado in Madrid.

A previously-unknown study on panel for the painting was identified in the Swansea Museum by Bendor Grosvenor (using the Art UK website) as part of the British BBC4 television programme Britain's Lost Masterpieces Conservation treatment was carried out by Simon Rollo Gillespie to repair the damaged panel and remove layers of disguising overpaint. The discovery was made at a time when the Museum's future was threatened by budget cuts. Its value is estimated at £3 million.

He also painted an earlier work on the subject of Meleager and Atalanta.

References

Paintings of the Museo del Prado by Flemish artists
Paintings by Jacob Jordaens
17th-century paintings
Paintings depicting Greek myths
Dogs in art
Horses in art